Chen Yanpeng (born May 26, 1996) is a Chinese baseball outfielder who represented China at the 2017 World Baseball Classic.

References

1996 births
Living people
2017 World Baseball Classic players
Chinese baseball players
Baseball outfielders